Arizona Village is a census-designated place (CDP) on the Fort Mojave Indian Reservation in Mohave County, Arizona, United States. The population was 1,057 at the 2020 census, up from 946 in 2010 and 351 in 2000.

Geography

Arizona Village is located in western Mohave County at  (34.853606, -114.584038). It is bordered to the southwest by the Colorado River, across which is the city of Needles, California. To the north the village is bordered by the Mohave Valley CDP. Arizona State Route 95 touches the northwest corner of Arizona Village, leading southwest across the Colorado into Needles and north  to Bullhead City.

Demographics

Arizona Village first appeared on the 2000 U.S. Census as a census-designated place (CDP). Although the village is on the Fort Mojave Indian Reservation, a plurality of the residents (as of 2010) are non-Hispanic White.

As of the census of 2000, there were 351 people, 83 households, and 77 families residing in the CDP. The racial makeup of the CDP was 89.5% Native American, 7.4% White, 0.3% Black or African American, 2.0% from other races, and 0.9% from two or more races.  24.2% of the population were Hispanic or Latino of any race.

There were 83 households, out of which 68.7% had children under the age of 18 living with them, 30.1% were married couples living together, 48.2% had a female householder with no husband present, and 7.2% were non-families. 7.2% of all households were made up of individuals, and none had someone living alone who was 65 years of age or older.  The average household size was 4.23 and the average family size was 4.25.

In the CDP the population was spread out, with 48.7% under the age of 18, 12.8% from 18 to 24, 26.5% from 25 to 44, 10.3% from 45 to 64, and 1.7% who were 65 years of age or older.  The median age was 19 years. For every 100 females there were 80.9 males.  For every 100 females age 18 and over, there were 87.5 males.

The median income for a household in the CDP was $26,406, and the median income for a family was $23,571. Males had a median income of $26,875 versus $21,667 for females. The per capita income for the CDP was $9,591.  About 23.0% of families and 22.4% of the population were below the poverty line, including 22.5% of those under age 18 and 50.0% of those age 65 or over.

Education
The area is zoned to the Mohave Valley Elementary School District.

High school students attend River Valley High School in the Colorado River Union High School District.

References

Census-designated places in Mohave County, Arizona